The 1992 Food City 500 was the sixth stock car race of the 1992 NASCAR Winston Cup Series season and the 32nd iteration of the event. The race was held on Sunday, April 5, 1992, before an audience of 62,300 in Bristol, Tennessee, at Bristol Motor Speedway, a 0.533 miles (0.858 km) permanent oval-shaped racetrack. The race took the scheduled 500 laps to complete. At race's end, Alan Kulwicki, driving for his own AK Racing team, would manage to make a late-race pass for the lead with 27 to go to take his fourth career NASCAR Winston Cup Series victory and his first victory of the season. To fill out the top three, Joe Gibbs Racing driver Dale Jarrett and Hendrick Motorsports driver Ken Schrader would finish second and third, respectively.

Background 

The Bristol Motor Speedway, formerly known as Bristol International Raceway and Bristol Raceway, is a NASCAR short track venue located in Bristol, Tennessee. Constructed in 1960, it held its first NASCAR race on July 30, 1961. Despite its short length, Bristol is among the most popular tracks on the NASCAR schedule because of its distinct features, which include extraordinarily steep banking, an all concrete surface, two pit roads, and stadium-like seating. It has also been named one of the loudest NASCAR tracks.

Entry list 

 (R) denotes rookie driver.

Qualifying 
Qualifying was originally scheduled to be split into two rounds. The first round was held on Friday, April 3, at 2:30 PM EST. Originally, the first 15 positions were going to be determined by first round qualifying, with positions 16-30 meant to be determined the following day on Saturday, April 4. However, due to rain, the second round was cancelled. As a result, the rest of the starting lineup was set using the results from the first round.

Jimmy Spencer was the only driver to fail to qualify.

Full qualifying results

Race results

Standings after the race 

Drivers' Championship standings

Note: Only the first 10 positions are included for the driver standings.

References 

1992 NASCAR Winston Cup Series
NASCAR races at Bristol Motor Speedway
April 1992 sports events in the United States
1992 in sports in Tennessee